Fish tale or fish tales may refer to:

 Fish Tales (EP), a 1990 EP by The 3Ds
 Fish Tales (film), a 1936 American animated short film starring Porky Pig
 Fish Tales (pinball), a 1992 pinball game
 Fish Tale Ale, a brand of the Fish Brewing Company in Olympia, Washington, United States
 A Fish Tale, an alternate title for the 2000 Danish animated film Help! I'm a Fish

See also
 The Tale of the Fisherman and the Fish, an 1833 fairy tale in verse by Alexander Pushkin
 Tall tale
 Fishtail (disambiguation)